AAA, Triple A, or Triple-A is a three-letter initialism or abbreviation which may refer to:

Airports
 Anaa Airport in French Polynesia (IATA airport code AAA)
 Logan County Airport (Illinois) (FAA airport code AAA)

Arts, entertainment, and media

Gaming 
 AAA (video game industry) - a category of high budget video games
 TripleA, an open source wargame

Music

Groups and labels
 AAA (band), a Japanese pop band
 Against All Authority (-AAA-), an American ska-punk band
 Acid Angel From Asia (AAA) the first sub-unit of K-pop girl group TripleS
referred to as "AVA"
 Triple A (musical group), a Dutch trance group

Works
 Song on City (Strapping Young Lad album)
 A.A.A (EP), by Nigerian band A.A.A

Other music
 Triple A or Adult Alternative Songs, a record chart

Other uses in arts,  entertainment, and media
 Adult album alternative, a radio format
 AAA, the production code for the 1970 Doctor Who serial Spearhead from Space
 <A.A.A> (Aces of ANSI Art), digital art group (1989-1991)
 AAA, a Japanese manga by Haruka Fukushima
 Anbanavan Asaradhavan Adangadhavan, a 2017 Tamil film

Brands and enterprises 
 Advanced Accelerator Applications, a radiopharmaceutical company
 Ansett Australia, a former airline (ICAO code)
 Associated American Artists, an art gallery
 Associated Argentine Artists, an Argentine film studio

Government and politics

Government agencies
 Agricultural Adjustment Administration, a US government agency 1933-1942
 Puerto Rico Aqueducts and Sewers Authority (AAA in Spanish)

Legislation
 Agricultural Adjustment Act of 1933, US
 Agricultural Adjustment Act of 1938, US

Political organizations
 Alianza Americana Anticomunista ("American Anticommunist Alliance" in Spanish), a Colombian para-military organization, 1978–1979
 Alianza Apostólica Anticomunista, in Spain
 Anti-Austerity Alliance, a political party in Ireland
 Argentine Anticommunist Alliance, a  mid-1970s death squad

Organizations

Arts organizations
 Allied Artists Association, an exhibiting society in London founded in 1908
 American Abstract Artists, founded 1936
 American Accordionists' Association
 Asia Art Archive, Hong Kong

Automobile associations
 American Automobile Association
 Australian Automobile Association

Other organizations

 Adopt-An-Alleyway Youth Empowerment Project, San Francisco, California
 Adventist Accrediting Association
 AG für Akkumulatoren- und Automobilbau, German automobile manufacturer
 American Academy of Actuaries
 American Accounting Association
 American Ambulance Association
 American Anthropological Association
 American Arbitration Association
 Antique Airplane Association
 Association of Autonomous Astronauts
 Ateliers d'Automobiles et d'Aviation, French automobile manufacturer
 Australian Archaeological Association

Science and technology

Biology and medicine 
 AAA proteins (ATPases Associated with various cellular Activities)
 Abdominal aortic aneurysm
 American Association for Anatomy
 Anti-actin antibodies
 Cavaticovelia aaa (aaa water treader), an insect from Hawaii
 Triple-A syndrome
 AAA, a codon for the amino acid lysine

Chemistry 
 Amalgam (chemistry), represented in medieval alchemical texts with "aaa"
 Amino acid analysis
 Aromatic amino acids
 Arylalkanolamine
 Asymmetric allylic alkylation

Computing 
 AAA, a level in Web Content Accessibility Guidelines
 Advanced Amiga Architecture chipset
 AAA (computer security), a security framework
 ASCII adjust after addition, an Intel BCD opcode

Other uses in science and technology 
 AAA battery, a size
 Angle-angle-angle, see Similarity (geometry)
 Anti-aircraft artillery

Sports 
 Amateur Athletic Association of England
 Arkansas Activities Association,  for high school sports
 Lucha Libre AAA Worldwide, a Mexican wrestling promotion
 Montreal AAA, athletic association, Canada
 Triple-A (baseball), North American minor league

Other uses
 "Access all areas", a form of backstage pass
 AAA, the best bond credit rating
 Ghotuo language (ISO 639-3 language code aaa)

See also 
 AAAA (disambiguation)